The Albany Medical Center Prize in Medicine and Biomedical Research is the United States' second highest value prize in medicine and biomedical research, awarded by the Albany Medical Center. Among prizes for medicine worldwide, the Albany Medical Center Prize is the fourth most lucrative (after the $3 million Breakthrough Prize in Life Sciences, the $1.2 million Nobel Prize in Medicine and the $1 million Shaw Prize in life science and medicine).

Awarded annually, the $500,000 prize is bestowed to any physician or scientist, or group, whose work has led to significant advances in the fields of health care and scientific research with demonstrated translational benefits applied to improved patient care.

The prize is a legacy to its founder, the late Morris "Marty" Silverman. At the inaugural awards ceremony in Albany, NY in March 2001, Silverman started a tradition that will be carried on for one hundred years, the duration of the Prize. Silverman's promise was to light one candle each year to honor that year's recipient.

Recipients 
2022: Press Release 
 C. David Allis
 Michael Grunstein
2021: Press Release 
 Barney Graham 
 Katalin Karikó
 Drew Weissman
2020: 
 Not awarded 
2019: Press Release
 Bert Vogelstein
 Irving Weissman
2018: Press Release
 James P. Allison
 Carl H. June
 Steven A. Rosenberg
2017: Press Release
Emmanuelle Charpentier
Jennifer Doudna
Luciano Marraffini
Francisco Juan Martínez Mojica
Feng Zhang
2016: Press Release
F. Ulrich Hartl 
Arthur L. Horwich
Susan L. Lindquist
2015: Press Release
Karl Deisseroth
Xiaoliang Xie
2014: Press Release
Alexander Varshavsky
2013: Press Release
Brian J. Druker
Peter C. Nowell
Janet D. Rowley
2012: Press Release
James E. Darnell Jr
Robert G. Roeder
2011: Press Release
Elaine Fuchs
James A. Thomson
Shinya Yamanaka
2010: Press Release
David Botstein
Francis S. Collins 
Eric S. Lander
2009: Press Release
Bruce A. Beutler
Charles A. Dinarello 
Ralph M. Steinman
2008: Press Release
Joan A. Steitz
Elizabeth Blackburn
2007: Press Release
Robert J. Lefkowitz
Solomon H. Snyder
Ronald M. Evans
2006: Press Release
Seymour Benzer
2005: Press Release
Robert S. Langer
2004: 
Stanley N. Cohen
Herbert W. Boyer
2003: 
Michael S. Brown
Joseph L. Goldstein
2002: 
Anthony Fauci
2001: 
Arnold J. Levine

See also

 List of medicine awards

References

 
 

Medicine awards
Awards established in 2001
Healthcare in New York (state)